Alan Bradshaw (14 September 1941 – 18 October 2020) was an English professional footballer who played as a midfielder for Blackburn Rovers, Crewe Alexandra, and Macclesfield Town.

Career
Born in Blackburn, Bradshaw joined his hometown team and scored in the club's 1959 FA Youth Cup final victory over West Ham United in Blackburn's only win in that competition. In September 1962, Bradshaw scored in his Rovers first team debut in a 4-2 defeat away to Wolverhampton Wanderers, and made 10 further appearances for the club, scoring twice, before leaving for Crewe Alexandra in 1965. He also spent time with Loughborough College in the early 1960s.

Bradshaw was later a youth team coach at Blackburn and managed local clubs Great Harwood, Padiham, Clitheroe and Chorley.

Honours
with Crewe Alexandra
Football League Fourth Division fourth-place promotion: 1967–68

References

1941 births
2020 deaths
Association football midfielders
Blackburn Rovers F.C. players
Crewe Alexandra F.C. players
English Football League players
English footballers
Loughborough University F.C. players
Macclesfield Town F.C. players
Footballers from Blackburn